The Thompson–Nicola Regional District is a regional district in the Canadian province of British Columbia. The Canada 2021 Census population was 143,680 and the area covers 44,449.49 square kilometres. The administrative offices are in the main population centre of Kamloops, which accounts for 78 percent of the regional district's population. The only other city is Merritt; other municipally-incorporated communities include the District Municipalities of Logan Lake, Barriere and Clearwater and the Villages of Chase, Ashcroft, Cache Creek, Clinton and Lytton, and also the Mountain Resort Municipality of Sun Peaks.

The region is named indirectly for the Thompson River by way of the traditional regional names of "the Thompson Country" and "the Nicola Country"; the Nicola Country was named for Chief Nicola and was originally "Nicola's Country", where he held sway; he is also the namesake of that river. The regional district government operates over 15 services including libraries, solid waste management and recycling, emergency and development services, plus a film commission. The region is unique in Canada as it consistently holds around some of the hottest summer temperatures in the country, while also containing an area around Ashcroft that may be the only arid climate in Canada.

Municipalities

Unincorporated communities
Arden Forest
Ashcroft Manor
Basque
Bighorn
Brookmere
Chasm
Jesmond
Kelly Lake
Loon Lake
Lower Hat Creek (Carquile)
Pritchard
Spences Bridge
Upper Hat Creek

Electoral Areas
Electoral Area "A" (Wells Gray Country)
Electoral Area "B" (Thompson Headwaters)
Electoral Area "E" (Bonaparte Plateau)
Electoral Area "I" (Blue Sky Country)
Electoral Area "J" (Copper Desert Country)
Electoral Area "L"
Electoral Area "M"
Electoral Area "N"
Electoral Area "O"
Electoral Area "P" (Rivers and the Peaks)

Demographics

Note: Totals greater than 100% due to multiple origin responses.

Parks
The regional district contains more than 60 provincial parks. See List of provincial parks of Thompson-Nicola Regional District.

Notes

References

External links

 
Thompson-Nicola